The 1984 All-Ireland Senior Ladies' Football Championship Final was the eleventh All-Ireland Final and the deciding match of the 1984 All-Ireland Senior Ladies' Football Championship, an inter-county ladies' Gaelic football tournament for the top teams in Ireland.

Kerry claimed their third title in a row, winning the only goalless final.

References

!
All-Ireland Senior Ladies' Football Championship Finals
Kerry county ladies' football team matches
Leitrim county ladies' football team matches
All-Ireland